Mary Frances Berry (born February 17, 1938) is an American historian, writer, lawyer, activist and professor who focuses on U.S. constitutional and legal, African-American history. Berry is the Geraldine R. Segal Professor of American Social Thought where she teaches American legal history at the Department of History, School of Arts & Sciences at the University of Pennsylvania. She is the former chairwoman of the United States Commission on Civil Rights. Previously, Berry was provost of the College of Behavioral and Social Science at University of Maryland, College Park, and was the first African American chancellor of the University of Colorado at Boulder.

Early life and education
Berry was born in Nashville, Tennessee, the second of the three children of George Ford and Frances Berry (née Southall). Because of economic hardship and family circumstances, she and her older brother were placed in an orphanage for a time.

Berry attended Nashville's segregated schools. In 1956, she graduated with honors from Pearl High School. She attended Fisk University in Nashville, where her primary interests were philosophy, history, and chemistry. Berry transferred to Howard University, where in 1961 she received her B.A. In 1962, she received her M.A. from Howard. In 1966, Berry received a Ph.D. in American constitutional history from the University of Michigan. In 1970, she earned a J.D. from the University of Michigan Law School.

Career
Berry spent seven years working at the University of Maryland, eventually becoming interim provost of the Division of Behavioral and Social Sciences. In 1976, she became chancellor of the University of Colorado in Boulder, Colorado, the first black woman to head a major research university.

In 1977, Berry took a leave of absence from the University of Colorado when President Jimmy Carter named her assistant secretary for education in the Department of Health, Education, and Welfare.

In 1980, Berry left the Department of Education to return to Howard University as a professor of history and law. Carter appointed her to the U.S. Civil Rights Commission, where during her tenure she became involved in legal battles with Carter's successor, Ronald Reagan. When Reagan attempted to remove her from the board, she successfully went to court to keep her seat. She clashed frequently on the commission with the Reagan-appointed chairman, Clarence M. Pendleton Jr. Pendleton tried to move the commission in line with Reagan's social and civil rights views and aroused the ire of liberals and feminists. He served from 1981 until his sudden death in 1988. 
  
In 1984, Berry co-founded the Free South Africa Movement, dedicated to the abolition of apartheid in South Africa. She was one of three prominent Americans arrested at the South African Embassy in Washington the day before Thanksgiving; the timing was deliberate to ensure maximum news exposure.

In 1987, Berry took a tenured chair at the University of Pennsylvania, while continuing to serve on the Civil Rights Commission.

In 1993, Berry's book The Politics of Parenthood: Child Care, Women's Rights, and the Myth of the Good Mother was published. Reviewing the book in The Christian Science Monitor, Laura Van Tuyl stated, "Berry presents a dispassionate history of the women's movement, day care, and home life, showing the persistent obstacles to economic and political power that have confronted women as a result of society's definition of them as 'mothers.' Her heavily footnoted chronology attributes the failure of the Equal Rights Amendment, the languishing of the women's movement in the '80s, and years of bickering over federal parental-leave and child care bills to an unwillingness to rethink gender roles." In 1993, Berry was also appointed chair of the Civil Rights Commission by President Bill Clinton, who reappointed her for another term in 1999.

Separately from her work on the Civil Rights Commission, Berry was named chair of the Pacifica Radio Foundation's National Board in June 1997. She drew controversy from listeners, programmers, and station staff, after she and the board attempted to modify programming in order to expand the listeners of the stations and to attract a more diverse audience. "White male hippies over 50," is how Berry described the programmers and audience of KPFA in Berkeley. Rumors of board actions involving the sale of flagship stations such as KPFA were widely circulated by the programmers. (Unlike most public service stations, Pacifica stations hold valuable high wattage licenses at commercial frequencies in major urban markets including New York City.) In 1999 she and Pacifica's Executive Director Lynn Chadwick fired the station's manager and issued a gag order, threatening to fire anyone else who worked at the station who spoke of their actions. Berry thereafter ordered a lockout of all KPFA personnel, in violation of station union agreements. She then proceeded to demand the imposition of racial preferences across the board at KPFA, though she refused to meet with minority staff people at the station, who mostly disagreed with her actions. Berry's actions in connection with Pacifica Radio brought protest from free speech groups such as the ACLU. She subsequently resigned from the Pacifica board.

She continued to serve as chair of the Civil Rights Commission. In 1999, Berry persuaded the Clinton administration to appoint Victoria Wilson, her editor at Alfred A. Knopf, to the commission. In 2001, she and the Democratic board members of the commission barred the seating of Peter Kirsanow, who had been appointed by President George W. Bush to replace Wilson on the commission. Berry and the Democratic bloc argued that Wilson was entitled to serve a full six-year term, but the Bush Administration contended that she had only been appointed to serve out the remainder of a previous member's term. Kirsanow sued, claiming Wilson's tenure had expired and he had been validly appointed. Wilson won in federal district court but ultimately lost on appeal in 2002, and the court ordered the seating of Kirsanow. The dispute determined which political party would have a majority of the board's members. Berry left office expiration of her term in late 2004 and was succeeded by Gerald A. Reynolds.

In 2009, her ninth book was published, a history of the Civil Rights Commission. Reviewing it in The New York Times, Samuel G. Freedman wrote, "Reviewing a book is not reviewing a life. For her public service on behalf of racial justice, Mary Frances Berry deserves her many accolades. But on the evidence of 'And Justice for All,' she may have been the wrong person to tell a story that obviously matters to her so deeply."

Leadership
 1974–1976: University of Maryland College of Behavioral and Social Sciences, Provost
 1976–1977: University of Colorado at Boulder, Chancellor
 1977–1980: U.S. Department of Health and Human Services, Assistant Secretary for Education 
 1980–2004: U.S. Commission on Civil Rights, Member; Vice-Chairman; Chairman (1993–2004)
 1987–present: University of Pennsylvania, Geraldine R. Segal Professor of American Social Thought
 1997–2000: Pacifica Radio, Chairman of the Board
 1990–1991: Organization of American Historians, President; Member
 American Historical Association, Member
 2003: Woodhull Freedom Foundation, Co-Founder

Awards and honors
 1965: Civil War Roundtable Fellowship Award
 1983: NAACP, Roy Wilkins Civil Rights Award
 1983: NAACP, Image Award, both from NAACP
 1985: Southern Christian Leadership Conference, Rosa Parks Award
 1985: Congressional Black Caucus Foundation, President's Award
 1986: Hubert H. Humphrey Civil Rights Award, 1986
 1986: Ms., Woman of the Year
 1987: National Council of Negro Women, Achievement Award
 2008: National Center for Health Research, Foremother Award
 2014: Organization of American Historians, Roy Rosenzweig Distinguished Service Award

Selected works and publications

Selected works

Selected publications

References

External links
 
 Mary Frances Berry at University of Pennsylvania School of Arts and Sciences
 
 “In Black America; Dr. Mary Frances Berry,” 1983-10-01, KUT Radio, American Archive of Public Broadcasting

1938 births
African-American social scientists
University of Michigan College of Literature, Science, and the Arts alumni
Living people
Pacifica Foundation people
People from Nashville, Tennessee
University of Pennsylvania faculty
University of Pennsylvania historian
University of Colorado faculty
Leaders of the University of Colorado Boulder
University of Michigan Law School alumni
Legal historians
United States Commission on Civil Rights members
American women historians
People for the American Way people
21st-century American historians
Women heads of universities and colleges
American women legal scholars
American legal scholars
21st-century American women